Moloacán is a municipality in Veracruz, Mexico.

The municipality of Moloacán is delimited to the north by Coatzacoalcos, to the east by Las Choapas, to the south by Minatitlán, and to the west by Ixhuatlán del Sureste.

It produces principally maize, beans, rice and orange fruit.

In May, a celebration takes place to honor to Santiago Apóstol, patron of the town.

The weather in Moloacán is hot all year round with rains in summer and autumn.

References

External links 

  Municipal Official webpage
  Municipal Official Information

Municipalities of Veracruz